Cocalus is also a genus of jumping spiders.

In Greek mythology, Cocalus was a king of Camicus in Sicily, according to Diodorus Siculus (book iv).

Myth 
After the escape of Daedalus and his son Icarus from King Minos's imprisonment, and the subsequent death of Icarus, Daedalus arrived in Sicily, where he was welcomed by Cocalus. Minos was, however, determined to find Daedalus, and he travelled from city to city offering a challenge: he presented a spiral seashell and asked for it to be strung all the way through. When he reached Kamikos, Cocalus, knowing that Daedalus would be able to solve the puzzle, showed it to him. Daedalus tied the thread to an ant, which walked through the seashell, stringing it all the way through.

Minos then knew Daedalus was sheltering in the court of Cocalus, and demanded that he be handed over. Cocalus managed to convince him to take a bath first, and Cocalus' daughters then killed Minos.

In literature 
 The myth of how Cocalus orchestrated Minos' death is shown in the fourth book of the Percy Jackson & the Olympians series, The Battle of the Labyrinth, via a dream.

References

Kings of Sicily
Kings in Greek mythology
Sicilian characters in Greek mythology
Cretan mythology